Pussy Island is an upcoming American thriller film directed by Zoë Kravitz, in her directorial debut, from a screenplay she co-wrote with E.T. Feigenbaum.

Premise
A cocktail waitress becomes infatuated with a tech mogul, and travels with him to his private island, where things begin to go wrong.

Cast

Production 
Zoë Kravitz started writing Pussy Island in 2017.  In June 2021, Kravitz revealed her plans to make her directorial debut with the film, the script of which she co-wrote with E.T. Feigenbaum. Channing Tatum will star in the movie, and at the Cannes Market, MGM won the distribution rights as Naomi Ackie was cast as Frida, the film's lead role. In May 2022, Simon Rex joined the cast. In July, Christian Slater, Alia Shawkat, Geena Davis, Adria Arjona, Haley Joel Osment and Kyle MacLachlan were amongst new castings added to the film.

Filming began on June 23, 2022, with production occurring in Mexico.

References

External links 
 

Upcoming films
Upcoming directorial debut films
American thriller films
Films shot in Mexico
Metro-Goldwyn-Mayer films